The 2022 Burg-Wächter Ladies Open was a professional tennis tournament played on indoor carpet courts. It was the ninth edition of the tournament which was part of the 2022 ITF Women's World Tennis Tour. It took place in Altenkirchen, Germany between 14 and 20 February 2022.

Singles main-draw entrants

Seeds

 1 Rankings are as of 7 February 2022.

Other entrants
The following players received wildcards into the singles main draw:
  Ekaterina Kuznetsova
  Eva Lys
  Julia Middendorf
  Nastasja Schunk

The following players received entry from the qualifying draw:
  Erika Andreeva
  Mona Barthel
  Jenny Dürst
  Noma Noha Akugue
  Arlinda Rushiti
  Ella Seidel

The following player received entry as a lucky loser:
  Angelina Wirges

Champions

Singles

  Greet Minnen def.  Daria Snigur, 6–4, 6–3

Doubles

  Mariam Bolkvadze /  Samantha Murray Sharan def.  Susan Bandecchi /  Simona Waltert, 6–3, 7–5

References

External links
 2022 Burg-Wächter Ladies Open at ITFtennis.com
 Official website

2022 ITF Women's World Tennis Tour
2022 in German sport
February 2022 sports events in Germany